39 Cygni is a binary star system near the southern border of the northern constellation of Cygnus, approximately 250 light years away from Earth. It is visible to the naked eye as an orange-hued star with an apparent visual magnitude of 4.43. The system is moving closer to the Sun with a heliocentric radial velocity of −17 km/s.

The system is around four billion years old.

It is probably on the horizontal branch, fusing helium in its core, but may be on the red giant branch fusing hydrogen in a shell around an insert helium core. It has 1.3 times the mass of the Sun and has expanded to 22 times the Sun's radius. The star is radiating 186 times the Sun's luminosity from its enlarged photosphere at an effective temperature of 4,259 K.

The unseen secondary component is most probably a main sequence star with a type between F and mid-K, although it may be a white dwarf instead. Its mass is at least 0.7–1.0 times the mass of the Sun.

References

K-type giants
Spectroscopic binaries
Cygnus (constellation)
Durchmusterung objects
Cygni, 39
194317
100587
7806